Kanniyakumari Lok Sabha constituency is one of the 39 Lok Sabha (parliamentary) constituencies in Tamil Nadu, a state in southern India.

Assembly Segments 
Kanniyakumari Lok Sabha constituency comprises the following legislative assembly segments:

List of members of parliament

Election Results

General bye-election 2021

General election 2019

General election 2014

General election 2009

See also
 Lok Sabha
 Parliament of India
 Kanniyakumari district
 List of Constituencies of the Lok Sabha
Nagercoil (Lok Sabha constituency)

References

External links
Election Commission of India
Kanniyakumari Lok Sabha - Result University
Kanniyakumari lok sabha  constituency election 2019 date and schedule

Lok Sabha constituencies in Tamil Nadu
Kanyakumari district